Tragocephala tournieri is a species of beetle in the family Cerambycidae. It was described by Lepesme and Stephan von Breuning in 1950.

References

tournieri
Beetles described in 1950